Chrysorabdia viridata is a moth of the subfamily Arctiinae first described by Francis Walker in 1865. It is found in the Indian states of Sikkim and Assam.

References

Lithosiini